Girlyboi are an American folk pop duo originally from Chicago, Illinois. Formed in 2015, Girlyboi started recording and performing in Europe as an "act of love". After releasing three singles - "Actual Woman", "Whole", and "Bedside", Girlyboi released its debut EP, Actual Woman, on December 17, 2015 at Rough Trade Records in New York City.

Girlyboi released its second EP, Good Looks, in 2016.

Formation

After meeting in Chicago, Illinois, Matick and Russ fled their home to pursue their musical career. They moved to Paris to escape the influence of American Pop-Culture and began to form their sound. In the midst of writing their first album, the couple were noticed by photographers and modeling agencies. The fear of objectification and "being packaged" frustrated Matick, but ultimately fueled the lyrical content of their music, which is described as "raw and self-aware".

Discography

Extended Play
 "Actual Woman EP" (2015)
 "Good Looks EP" (2016)

Singles
 "Actual Woman" (2015)
 "Whole" (2015)
 "Bedside" (2015)

References

Indie rock musical groups from Illinois
Musical groups established in 2011
American shoegaze musical groups
Dream pop musical groups
Musical quartets
2011 establishments in Illinois